Bruce Stuckey (born 19 February 1947) is an English former professional footballer who played as a right winger. Active in both England and the United States, Stuckey made over 250 career appearances.

Career
Born in Torquay, Stuckey began his career with the youth team of Exeter City, and made his debut for the senior team in the Football League during the 1965–1966 season. Stuckey also played in the Football League for Sunderland, Torquay United, Reading and Bournemouth, before playing in the North American Soccer League with the Connecticut Bicentennials.

External links

NASL career stats

1947 births
Living people
English footballers
Exeter City F.C. players
Sunderland A.F.C. players
Torquay United F.C. players
Reading F.C. players
AFC Bournemouth players
Connecticut Bicentennials players
English Football League players
North American Soccer League (1968–1984) players
Association football midfielders
English expatriate sportspeople in the United States
Expatriate soccer players in the United States
English expatriate footballers